, known in North America as Covert Ops: Nuclear Dawn, is a video game created by Sugar & Rockets for the PlayStation, and released in 2000. On March 16, 2000 Activision announced that they had acquired the North American publishing rights to Chase the Express. The game was then renamed Covert Ops: Nuclear Dawn for the North American market.

Plot
In Eastern Europe, a terrorist group known as the "Knights of the Apocalypse," led by ex-KGB agent Boris Zugoski, successfully breach and board the NATO armored train, Blue Harvest, on the outskirts of St. Petersburg. Among those on board is the French Ambassador, Pierre Simon, his wife Catherine, and daughter, Jane. Zugoski demands 20 billion US dollars and safe passage into France in exchange for the lives of the Simon family. The presence of a nuclear bomb on board the train also presents a great risk. A NATO team is killed in the initial attack, leaving Lieutenant Jack Morton as the sole survivor, dangling for his life on the side of the train. After pulling himself back up, he makes contact with the UN International Counterterrorist Organization, who brief him on the situation, inform him they've dispatched a rescue team and order him to safeguard the Simon family until they arrive.

Soon after making his way back into the train, Jack finds the ambassador and his secretary, Philip Mason, in the VIP lounge of Car 10. Jack is then given the task of rescuing the French Ambassador's wife and daughter. Along the way he encounters Christina Wayborn, one of the ambassador's Special Police. After finding the ambassador's family and clearing Car 14, Jack calls in a rescue team who save the ambassador's wife and daughter. However, the ambassador has gone missing. Jack returns to the VIP lounge to find out that the French Ambassador has been taken away, and Mason was knocked out in the struggle.

Shortly after, the United Nations inform Jack that the terrorists intend to launch missiles against neighboring countries in retaliation for rescuing the ambassador's family. Jack blows up one of the missiles after meeting Sergeant Billy MacGuire, a grievously wounded soldier. Afterwards, he makes his way to the control room and stops the launch procedure. He then uses the AA gun on the train to shoot down enemy helicopters guarding it from another rescue crew.

After this, Boris contacts the UN and makes the same demand in exchange for the French Ambassador. The council abort the rescue mission and Jack reconvenes with Christina and Mason in Car 9.

The events of the game here change depending on the scenario the player is doing. If on Scenario S, Jack fights an enemy boss using a crossbow and takes the crossbow. If not Scenario S, a freight train pulls alongside the Blue Harvest and Jack jumps onto it to fight the boss. After defeating the boss, Morton is then given a limited time to return to the Blue Harvest to avoid death.

Jack makes his way to Car 5 and finds an IC Chip. If playing on Scenario S, Jack is gassed and taken to a church, leaving a player-controlled Christina to rescue him and return to the train.

Jack heads to Car 6 after hearing a gunshot over the radio, and after rescuing Christina he is given a message by Boris to meet at Car 12. Jack directs Christina to Car 4 to search for the ambassador while he heads to Car 12. When Jack reaches Car 12, Boris demands Jack hand over the IC Chip and the ambassador. Jack is confused and states that the terrorists are holding the ambassador hostage. Boris will then shoot Billy (if he has survived his blood transfusion) and fight Jack. After Boris is defeated, whether or not Billy has survived the gunshot depends on if the player gave him his bulletproof vest.

Jack returns to Car 4, only to learn that Mason was revealed to be a double agent sent to steal a data disk and the IC Chip from the Blue Harvest.  After Jack hands Mason the IC Chip in exchange for a captured Christina, the ambassador reveals himself and leads Jack to the VIP lounge, where the data disc is kept. Jack takes the data disk. Morton heads to Car 15, where he can optionally give Mason the real data disk, or a fake data disk in return for Christina. Mason then reveals what is on the disk: a blueprint for a hydrogen engine that could provide the world with almost limitless power, the same technology which the Blue Harvest's engine is based on. After triggering a small bomb in Car 15, he escapes in a helicopter and leaves Jack and Christina to escape the car on their own, rejoining the ambassador and Billy.

Upon regrouping, it is revealed that there are 6 nuclear warheads wired into the Blue Harvest's engine. Morton is given the task of defusing these warheads before the train reaches a nearby tunnel, or the NATO council will remotely detonate the train to prevent it reaching Paris. After Jack successfully defuses the warheads, Christina warns him that the train itself will be used as a nuclear missile, with the detonation device at the front of the train.

Jack detaches the front car of the train from the rest and makes his way onto the front as the train enters a tunnel. After he defuses the bomb (if he gave Mason the fake information disc) Mason's helicopter will arrive and attempt to kill Jack.

The endings are affected by many different factor throughout the game. One of these factors is what data disk the player gave Mason in exchange for Christina. Another is whether or not Billy survives the events of the game.

Gameplay
The game is a third-person shooter, with other elements including puzzle solving, key searching, stealth and, at several points, driving the train. The game is divided into levels which take place on each carriage of the train, one such carriage may require the player to find key A that opens door B, while another could lead to a boss battle before disarming a bomb. The story here is not completely linear, events can change the entire game's course. The player can use hand-to-hand combat or ranged combat using a variety of weapons. Weapons can be customized using parts obtained throughout the game.

Game saves are completed in the train's toilets, where there is also an item box to store items inside.

Cast

Reception

The game received "mixed" reviews according to the review aggregation website GameRankings. IGN criticized its gameplay for bad controls and game design despite praising the graphics and stating that the game had "detailed environments and solid player models". Daniel Erickson of Next Generation called it "A good weekend rental with nice graphics but nothing to really sink your teeth into." In Japan, Famitsu gave it a score of 30 out of 40.

See also
Under Siege 2: Dark Territory

References

External links

2000 video games
Activision games
PlayStation (console) games
PlayStation (console)-only games
Single-player video games
Sony Interactive Entertainment games
Third-person shooters
Video games about bomb disposal
Video games developed in Japan
Video games scored by Takeo Miratsu
Video games about terrorism